The Satuan Polisi Pamong Praja (translated literally as "Public Order Enforcers Police", abbreviated as Satpol PP, Pol-PP, or PolPP), are municipal police units throughout Indonesia which are under the control of the local governments of each province, city, and regency (Kabupaten). Its purpose is to assist regional heads (provincial governors, city mayors and/or regents) in enforcing regional regulations and administering public order and public security, the Satpol PP is formed in every province, city, and/or regency. It is under the auspices of the Ministry of Home Affairs.

Function and authority

Function
According to the Government Regulation No. 6 of 2010 regarding the Satuan Polisi Pamong Praja, its functions are:
preparing and implementing regional regulations enforcement, implementation of public order, public security and protection of the community;
enforcing policies of the regional regulations and regional head regulations;
administer public and community order in the regions;
implementing community protection policies;
implementing coordination in the enforcement of regional regulations and regional head regulations, implementation of public order and public security in coordination with the Indonesian National Police (Polri), regional Civil Servant Investigative agencies, and/or other apparatus;
supervising the community, apparatus, or legal entities in order to comply with the regional regulations and regional head regulations; and
implementing other duties mandated and/or instructed directly by the regional head (governor, mayor and/or regent)

Authority
carry out non-judicial enforcement actions towards the public, officials, or legal entities that violate the local regulations 
take action against the public, civil apparatus, or legal entities that disturb and create nuisance to the public order and security;
carry out investigations towards members of the public, apparatus, or legal entities that are suspected of violating the regional regulations and/or regional head regulations; and
carry out administrative actions towards members of the public, apparatus, or legal entities that are suspected of violating the regional regulations and/or regional head regulations.

Differences with the National Police (Polri) 
There has been some confusion and mix-up about the roles and responsibilities of the municipal police units and the Indonesian National Police among the general public. Generally, the municipal police enforces the policies and laws of the local government's regulation, therefore answering to their respective area's head of government. Meanwhile, the Indonesian National Police enforces the Indonesian national constitutional laws and regulations. Both acts as law enforcement agencies but the Satpol PP report to the local governor, mayor and/or regent, meanwhile the Indonesian National Police reports to the Chief of the Indonesian National Police (Kapolri) which then is responsible to the President.

Operationally, both law enforcement institutions coordinate with each other in implementing law enforcement duties throughout Indonesia. Arrests made towards members of the public suspected of breaking any law concerned with the constitution of the country is done by the Indonesian National Police, the Satpol PP meanwhile may arrest people in a situational scenario but has to hand it over to the police. The Satpol PP are not armed meanwhile the police are armed. Generally, the police has more authority than the Satpol PP in the area of law enforcement.

Controversy 

In 2010, a controversial decree by Gamawan Fauzi (then Minister of Home Affairs), allows members of the unit to be armed with gas-powered revolvers or blanks, electric shock sticks, and baton for riots and crowd control.

Ranks and insignia 
The municipal and regional  units and their personnel, which come from the civil service of local governments, form the police arm of the wider Employees' Corps of the Republic of Indonesia (Korps Pegawai Republik Indonesia), the state trade union of civil service staff, and thus wear insignia similar to those used by the civil service while wearing the Ceremonial uniform (PDU), service uniform (PDH), and field uniform (PDL). They wear brown shoulder boards with the  service uniform and gold in the ceremonial dress uniform, with red piping used by senior ranked personnel in command billets. In addition, they wear the brown beret regardless of uniform.

References

Law enforcement in Indonesia
Municipal law enforcement agencies